Gunnedah Shire is a local government area in the North West Slopes region of New South Wales, Australia.  The Shire is located adjacent to the Liverpool Plains in the Namoi River valley and is traversed by the Oxley Highway and the Kamilaroi Highway.

The Shire was established in 1980 from the amalgamation of the Municipality of Gunnedah and Liverpool Plains Shire. It includes the town of Gunnedah and surrounding villages of Curlewis, Breeza, Carroll, Mullaley, Emerald Hill, Tambar Springs and Kelvin.

The Mayor of Gunnedah Shire Council is Cr. Jamie Chaffey, who is unaligned with any political party.

Geography

The climate is hot in summer, mild in winter and dry, although heavy rain in catchment areas occasionally cause flooding of the Namoi River. Major floods cut transport links to Gunnedah, briefly isolating it from the outside world. The Gunnedah area is noted for its abundance of native wildlife, including kangaroos, echidnas and koalas. Koalas can often be found in trees within the town, as well as in the surrounding countryside with the help of signs placed by the local tourist centre.

Demographics
Gamilaroi Nation of Aboriginal and Torres Strait Islander people made up 12.8% of the population which is over four times higher than both the national and state averages. The median age of people in the Gunnedah Shire was 40 years; slightly higher than the national median of 38. Children aged 0 – 14 years made up 20.6% of the population and people aged 65 years and over made up 19% of the population. Of people in the area aged 15 years and over, almost half were married (48.1%) and 11.6% were either divorced or separated.

Population growth in the Gunnedah Shire between the 2001 census and the 2011 census was nominal. When compared with total population growth of Australia for the same periods, being 5.78% and 8.32% respectively, population growth in the Gunnedah local government area was significantly lower than the national average. The median weekly income for residents within the Gunnedah Shire was significantly below the national average.

At the 2011 census, the proportion of residents in the Gunnedah local government area who stated their ancestry as Australian or Anglo-Saxon exceeded 87% of all residents (national average was 65.2%). In excess of 72% of all residents in the Gunnedah Shire nominated a religious affiliation with Christianity at the 2011 census, which was significantly higher than the national average of 50.2%. Meanwhile, as at the census date, compared to the national average, households in the Gunnedah local government area had a significantly lower than average proportion (2.3%) where two or more languages are spoken (national average was 20.4%); and a significantly higher proportion (92.9%) where English only was spoken at home (national average was 76.8%).

Council

Current composition and election method
Gunnedah Shire Council is composed of nine councillors elected proportionally as a single ward. All Councillors are elected for a fixed four-year term of office. The mayor is elected by the councillors at the first meeting of the council. The most recent election was held on 10 September 2016, and the makeup of the council is as follows:

The current Council, elected in 2016, in order of election, is:

References

 
Local government areas of New South Wales
New England (New South Wales)
1980 establishments in Australia